Khandaker Shaheed Uddin Firoz (known as KS Firoz; 7 July 1946 – 9 September 2020) was a Bangladeshi actor.

Background and career
Firoz was born in Wazirpur, Barisal in the then  Bengal Presidency, British India. He was brought up in Dhaka's Lalbagh area.

Firoz joined the Bangladesh Army in 1967, and reached the rank of Major before retiring in 1977. He was active in the Dhaka theatre circuit, and got his breakthrough in King Lear. He made his career debut in the television drama Dwip Tobuo Jwoley and in films in Lawarish.

Personal life
Firoz married Madhobi in 1974, and had three daughters. He died from COVID-19 complications during the COVID-19 pandemic in Bangladesh on 9 September 2020, at the age of 74.

Works
Films
 Padma Nadir Majhi
 Nodir Naam Modhumoti
 Shankhonad
 Brihonnola
 Chandragrohon
 Tumi Amar (1994)
 Devdas

Drama
 Ayomoy
 Banshi
 Dressing Table (2016)

References

External links
 

1946 births
2020 deaths
Bangladeshi male actors
Bangladeshi male television actors
Deaths from the COVID-19 pandemic in Bangladesh
Burials at Banani Graveyard